A field trip or excursion is a journey by a group of people to a place away from their normal environment.

When done for students, as it happens in several school systems, it is also known as school trip in the UK, Australia, New Zealand and Bangladesh, and school tour in Ireland.

A 2022 study, which used randomized controlled trial data, found that culturally enriching field trips led students to show a greater interest in arts, greater tolerance for people with different views, and boosted their educational outcomes.

Overview
The purpose of the field trip is usually observation for education, non-experimental research or to provide students with experiences outside their everyday activities, such as going camping with teachers and their classmates. The aim of this research is to observe the subject in its natural state and possibly collect samples. It is seen that more-advantaged children may have already experienced cultural institutions outside of school, and field trips provide common ground with more-advantaged and less-advantaged children to have some of the same cultural experiences in the arts.

Field trips are most often done in 3 steps: preparation, activities and follow-up activity. Preparation applies to both the student and the teacher. Teachers often take the time to learn about the destination and the subject before the trip. Activities that happen on the field trips often include: lectures, tours, worksheets, videos and demonstrations. Follow-up activities are generally discussions that occur in the classroom once the field trip is completed.

In Western culture people first come across this method during school years when classes are taken on school trips to visit a geological or geographical feature of the landscape, for example. Much of the early research into the natural sciences was of this form. Charles Darwin is an important example of someone who has contributed to science through the use of field trips.

Popular field trip sites include zoos, nature centers, community agencies such as fire stations and hospitals, government agencies, local businesses, amusement parks, science museums, and factories. Field trips provide alternative educational opportunities for children and can benefit the community if they include some type of community service. Field trips also provide students the opportunity to take a break from their normal routine and experience more hands-on learning. Places like zoos and nature centers often have an interactive display that allow children to touch plants or animals.

Today, culturally enriching field trips are in decline. Museums across the United States report a steep drop in school tours. For example, the Field Museum in Chicago at one time welcomed more than 300,000 students every year. Recently, the number is below 200,000. Between 2002 and 2007, Cincinnati arts organizations saw a 30 percent decrease in student attendance. A survey by the American Association of School Administrators found that more than half of schools eliminated planned field trips in 2010–11.

Site school 
A variation on the field trip is the "site-based program" or "site-school" model, where a class temporarily relocates to a non-school location for an entire week to take advantage of the resources on the site.  As with a multi-day field trip, appropriate overnight camping or lodging arrangements are often made to accommodate the experience.  The approach was first developed at the Calgary Zoo in Alberta, Canada in 1993, and "Zoo School" was inaugurated in 1994.  The Calgary Board of Education then approached the Glenbow Museum and Archives to create a "Museum School" in 1995 followed by the Calgary Science Centre (1996), the University of Calgary (1996), Canada Olympic Park (1997), the Inglewood Bird Sanctuary (1998), Calgary City Hall (2000), Cross Conservation Area (2000), the Calgary Stampede (2002), the Calgary Aero-Space Museum (2005), and the Fire Training Academy (2008). One of the newer schools in Calgary is Tinker School and Social Enterprise School as STEM Learning Lab (2018)  The model spread across Alberta (with 15 sites in Edmonton alone), throughout Canada and in the United States.  Global coordination of the model is through the "Beyond the Classroom Network".

See also

School bus
Museum education
Excursion
Grand Tour
Experiential learning

References

Research methods
School terminology
Museum education
Types of travel
Childhood
Field research
High school research

Education by method
Educational environment
Education events
Educational projects